In mathematics, subtle cardinals and ethereal cardinals are closely related kinds of large cardinal number.

A cardinal κ is called subtle if for every closed and unbounded C ⊂ κ and for every sequence A of length κ for which element number δ (for an arbitrary δ), Aδ ⊂ δ, there exist α, β, belonging to C, with α < β, such that Aα = Aβ ∩ α.

A cardinal κ is called ethereal if for every closed and unbounded C ⊂ κ and for every sequence A of length κ for which element number δ (for an arbitrary δ), Aδ ⊂ δ and Aδ has the same cardinal as δ, there exist α, β, belonging to C, with α < β, such that card(α) = card(Aβ ∩ Aα).

Any subtle cardinal is ethereal, and any strongly inaccessible ethereal cardinal is subtle.

Theorem 

There is a subtle cardinal ≤ κ if and only if every transitive set S of cardinality κ contains x and y such that x is a proper subset of y and x ≠ Ø and x ≠ {Ø}. An infinite ordinal κ is subtle if and only if for every λ < κ, every transitive set S of cardinality κ includes a chain (under inclusion) of order type λ.

See also
 List of large cardinal properties

References 

 

Large cardinals